Conophytum is a genus of South African and Namibian succulent plants that belong to the family Aizoaceae. The name is derived from the Latin conus (cone) and Greek phytum (plant). The plants are also known as knopies (buttons in Afrikaans), waterblasies (water blisters in Afrikaans), sphaeroids, conos, cone plants, dumplings, or button plants.

Taxonomy
The genus is sometimes wrongly referred to as Conophyton, the name that Adrian Hardy Haworth suggested in 1821: "If this section proves to be a genus, the name of Conophyton would be apt". However, this was too tentative to establish a validly published generic name and also, Haworth himself neither adopted it nor accepted the genus. The genus was neither recognised nor validly named until the name Conophytum was published 101 years later.

Description
Conophytum species are dwarf cushion-forming or single-bodied succulents. Members of the genus are tiny plants with succulent leaves ranging from 1/4" to 2" in length. These leaves are partially or entirely fused along their centers. Each leaf pair (together referred to as a body) ranges in shape from "bilobed" to spherical to ovoid to tubular to conical. Some species have epidermal windows on the top of their leaves. To the naked eye the epidermis ranges from very smooth to slightly rough to hairy, depending on the microscopic epidermal cell shape and structure. In their normal, natural state each stem has only one pair of leaves at a time though one plant may have dozens of stems and thus dozens of leaf pairs. When very heavy rains come to their native habitat they may grow luxuriantly and develop two leaf pairs per stem simultaneously; this is called "stacking up" of the leaves. The plants grow very slowly; depending on the species, a 50-year-old plant might not be bigger than a walnut.

Cultivation
Several species of Conophytum are found in cultivation. In temperate regions they are best grown in a specialist medium with the protection of glass, as they do not tolerate temperatures below .

Conservation
Recently several species have been threatened with extinction due to mining and poaching from the wild for the black market. These plants are mainly sold to collectors in Asian countries, where there has been a high demand for them. In June 2021, police arrested a dozen men at a farm in the Western Cape for possession of 4,000 Conophytum acutum; this came as a surprise as scientists thought there were only about a thousand of the plants in the wild and none on the farm in question. Teams at the Kirstenbosch Botanical Garden are collecting and categorising seeds from Conophytum and other succulents in partnership with the Millennium Seed Bank.

Species  
This is a list of species in the genus Conophytum.

References

 
Aizoaceae genera
Flora of Namibia
Flora of South Africa
Flora of the Cape Provinces
Succulent plants
Taxa named by N. E. Brown